Afra Airways is an airline based in Burundi, that plans to operate flights out of Bujumbura International Airport by the end of 2016. The airline received an Air Services Licence in April 2016 but at that time had not been awarded an air operator's certificate. The airline plans to operate ERJ 145s and Bombardier CRJ200 aircraft to nearby destinations. The airlines first destination is planned to be Kigali.

As of 2021 the airline has still yet to launch any flights.

History 
Afra Airways registered in Burundi on 15 April 2016 as a commercial passenger airline in Bujumbura. The airline was founded by Manuel Pereira who is the founder of the Spanish company Emitur S.A.

See also 

 Transport in Burundi

References

External links 

Airlines of Burundi
Airlines established in 2016
Bujumbura
Government-owned airlines